Coprinellus aureogranulatus is a species of mushroom in the family Psathyrellaceae. It was first described as Coprinus aureogranulatus by mycologists C.B. Uljé and A. Aptroot in 1998, and later transferred to the genus Coprinellus in 2001.

References

aureogranulatus
Taxa named by André Aptroot
Fungi described in 1998
Fungi of New Guinea
Fungi